Hallsville may refer to:

Hallsville, New South Wales, Australia

United States
 Hallsville, Illinois

 Hallsville, Missouri
 Hallsville, New York
 Hallsville, Ohio
 Hallsville, Texas
 Hallsville, North Carolina

See also

 Hallsville High School (disambiguation)
 
 Halls (disambiguation)

 Ville (disambiguation)
 Halltown (disambiguation)
 Halton (disambiguation)
 Hallville (disambiguation)